Calhoun County Courthouse may refer to:

 Calhoun County Courthouse (Alabama), Anniston, Alabama
 Calhoun County Courthouse (Arkansas), Hampton, Arkansas
 Old Calhoun County Courthouse, Blountstown, Florida
 Calhoun County Courthouse (Georgia), Morgan, Georgia
 Calhoun County Courthouse (Illinois), Hardin, Illinois
 Calhoun County Courthouse (Iowa), Rockwell City, Iowa
 Calhoun County Courthouse (South Carolina), St. Matthews, South Carolina